Rahimabad (also Romanized as Raḩīmābād) is a village in Layl Rural District, in the Central District of Lahijan County, Gilan Province, Iran. At the 2006 census, its population was 98, in 31 families.

References 

Populated places in Lahijan County